Yangon Region Hluttaw is the legislature of the Burmese region of Yangon Region. It is a unicameral body, consisting of 123 members, including 92 elected members and 31 military representatives. As of February 2016, the Hluttaw was led by speaker Tin Maung Tun of the National League for Democracy (NLD).

The regional legislature convenes at the Yangon Region Hluttaw building on Pyay Road in Dagon Township. The building formerly housed the national parliament.

In 2013, the Yangon Region Hluttaw adopted the 2013 Yangon City Municipal Law, which holds the Yangon City Development Committee and the Yangon city mayor accountable to the legislature, including its budgetary power.

Following the general elections in 2015, the Yangon Region Hluttaw saw a sweep towards the National League for Democracy, winning all but four of the seat contested in the election.

General Election results (Nov. 2015)

See also
State and Region Hluttaws
Pyidaungsu Hluttaw
Amyotha Hluttaw
Pyithu Hluttaw

References

Unicameral legislatures
Yangon Region
Legislatures of Burmese states and regions